Holdfast is a village in the Canadian province of Saskatchewan within the Rural Municipality of Sarnia No. 221 and Census Division No. 6. The village is located 2 km east of Highway 2 on Highway 732, about 97.6 km northwest of the City of Regina.

History 
Holdfast incorporated as a village on October 5, 1911.

Demographics 

Services
Below is a list of businesses, services & organizations located in Holdfast:

 Village of Holdfast Office
 Rural Municipality of Sarnia office
 Holdfast Fire Hall
 Holdfast Post office
 Holdfast Library
 Holdfast Parks-And-Rec Committee
 Schell School - (Home of the Pacers)
 Sarnia Community Complex - (Home of the Holdfast Trackstoppers)
 Holdfast Family Diner
 James' Grocery Store
 Aussie Welding and Manufacturing
 Holdfast Tavern And Liquor Store
 Conexus Credit Union
 Long Lake Insurance and Promotional Prod
 Holdfast Roman Catholic Church
 Holdfast Baseball Diamonds - Home of the Arm River Indians
 Mcrae Farm Service, Card Lock And Credit Card Gas Station

See also 

 List of communities in Saskatchewan
 Villages of Saskatchewan

References

Villages in Saskatchewan
Sarnia No. 221, Saskatchewan
Division No. 6, Saskatchewan